Verwitterte Melodie, or Weather-beaten Melody, is a 1942 animated short, made in Nazi Germany. It was written mainly by cartoonist Hans Fischerkoesen, although the sole credits often went to Horst von Möllendorff . It was animated by Jiří Brdečka in Prague.

Plot 
The general outline of the plot is of a bee that finds an abandoned phonograph in a meadow and uses her stinger as a stylus to play the record on it.

External links 
 
 
 

1942 films
1942 animated films
1942 short films
1940s animated short films
German animated short films
Films of Nazi Germany
Films with screenplays by Horst von Möllendorff
1940s German films